Baddukonda Appala Naidu (born 1975), alternatively Baddukonda Appalanaidu, is an Andhra Pradesh politician and YSR Congress Party leader.

Personal life
Naidu was born in 1975 at Mopada village in Denkada Mandal, Vizianagaram district. He is a relative of Andhra Pradesh state minister Botsa Satyanarayana.

Political life
Naidu was represented as the Chairman of Vizianagaram Zilla Parishad during 2007–2009. He Represented Nellimarla (Assembly constituency) as a legislator in 2009 as the Indian National Congress Party candidate. In 2014, he lost to Telugu Desam Party candidate Pathivada Narayanaswamy Naidu. In 2019, he was elected second time legislator from the Nellimarla (Assembly constituency) as a YSR Congress Party party candidate.

References

Living people
Andhra Pradesh politicians
Indian National Congress politicians from Andhra Pradesh
People from Vizianagaram
People from Vizianagaram district
People from Uttarandhra
YSR Congress Party politicians
1975 births